Eliya II Bar Moqli was Patriarch of the Church of the East from 1111 to 1132.

Sources 
Brief accounts of Eliya's patriarchate are given in the Ecclesiastical Chronicle of the Jacobite writer Bar Hebraeus (floruit 1280) and in the ecclesiastical histories of the fourteenth-century Nestorian writers Amr and Sliba. A more substantial account is given by the twelfth-century historian Mari.

See also
 List of patriarchs of the Church of the East

References

Sources
 Abbeloos, J. B., and Lamy, T. J., Bar Hebraeus, Chronicon Ecclesiasticum (3 vols, Paris, 1877)
 Assemani, J. A., De Catholicis seu Patriarchis Chaldaeorum et Nestorianorum (Rome, 1775)
 Brooks, E. W., Eliae Metropolitae Nisibeni Opus Chronologicum (Rome, 1910)
 Gismondi, H., Maris, Amri, et Salibae: De Patriarchis Nestorianorum Commentaria I: Amri et Salibae Textus (Rome, 1896)
 Gismondi, H., Maris, Amri, et Salibae: De Patriarchis Nestorianorum Commentaria II: Maris textus arabicus et versio Latina (Rome, 1899)

External links 

Patriarchs of the Church of the East
12th-century bishops of the Church of the East
Nestorians in the Abbasid Caliphate
1132 deaths